The World Council for Health is a pseudo-medical organisation dedicated to spreading misinformation about COVID-19 vaccines and promoting fake COVID-19 treatments.

Description 

The organization's online appearance is that of a mainstream health organization, though it promotes discredited treatments and is anti-vaccination. The group appears to have been formed in September 2021 and its published leadership contains people which an Australian Associated Press fact check described as "figures who have promoted unfounded conspiracy theories".

 the group was led by Tess Lawrie, an obstetrician and founder of the "BIRD Group", which promotes ivermectin as a COVID-19 treatment.

The World Council for Health is affiliated with Children's Health Defense, an antivaccine association led by Robert F. Kennedy Jr., and World Doctors Alliance, an independent organization of anti-vaccine school.

Activities 

The World Council for Health promotes misinformation linking COVID-19 vaccination with death. In 2021 the group promoted claims on social media of a condition they called "Post-COVID injection syndrome". The condition is however not recognized in medical science, and there is no evidence any such condition is caused by vaccination.

In May 2022 the group was involved in a conference in Bath, England which Vice World News described as a meeting of the "biggest names in the global anti-vax and coronavirus conspiracy scenes". The local authorities withdrew permission to use their venues after reviewing the publicity of the World Council for Health falsely claiming that COVID-19 vaccines were unsafe.

The group promotes ivermectin as a treatment for COVID-19, although research has determined it is ineffective for this purpose.

See also 
 Front Line COVID-19 Critical Care Alliance
 Health Advisory and Recovery Team
 Children's Health Defense
 World Doctors Alliance

Notes

References 

 AAP FactCheck. 
 
 
 
 
 
 

Organizations established for the COVID-19 pandemic
Medical controversies in the United Kingdom
Medical and health organisations based in the United Kingdom
COVID-19 conspiracy theorists
Organizations established in 2021

External links